Artem Lesiuk (born 30 November 1996) is a Ukrainian judoka.

He was the silver medalist at the 2019 Marrakech Grand Prix  and he represented Ukraine at the 2020 Summer Olympics held in Tokyo, Japan. He competed in the men's 60 kg event.

He won the gold medal in his event at the 2022 Judo Grand Slam Tel Aviv held in Tel Aviv, Israel.

References

External links
 
 
 

1996 births
Ukrainian male judoka
Living people
Sportspeople from Kyiv
Judoka at the 2019 European Games
European Games competitors for Ukraine
Judoka at the 2020 Summer Olympics
Olympic judoka of Ukraine
21st-century Ukrainian people